On April 27, 2012, a multinational team of television studios staged an airplane crash near Mexicali, Mexico. An unmanned Boeing 727-200, fitted with numerous cameras, crash test dummies and other scientific instruments, was flown into the ground. The exercise was filmed for television.

Aircraft and test site
The aircraft used was a Boeing 727-200 purchased by the television production companies, registration XB-MNP (formerly N293AS).

The site in Mexico was chosen because authorities in the United States would not allow the test to take place.
The aircraft's original owner was Singapore Airlines. The last United-States-based owner was Broken Wing LLC of Webster Groves, Missouri, who then exported it and transferred it to a Mexican production company. Broken Wing is also the company that planned and executed the experiment. The aircraft had been leased to Bob Dole's 1996 presidential election campaign by the then-owner AvAtlantic.

Flight
Several federal permits by the Mexican government were needed before the remote controlled flight and crash could be performed. In addition, the Mexican authorities stipulated that the aircraft had to be flown by humans during part of the flight, since it would be flying over a populated area.

The flight was piloted by captain Jim Bob Slocum, then controlled remotely by Chip Shanle, a former United States Navy pilot who works at American Airlines.

The airplane took off from General Rodolfo Sánchez Taboada International Airport in Mexicali, with three flight crew and three support jumpers, as well as a number of crash dummies, and with a chase plane Cessna Skymaster following close behind. As the flight progressed towards the Sonoran Desert of Baja California in Mexico, its occupants parachuted to safety via the 727's ventral airstair. Slocum was the last one to leave the jet, three minutes before impact. Shanle then flew the jetliner by remote control, from the chase plane.

Upon impact, the Boeing 727 broke up into several sections, the main landing gear collapsing with the cockpit being torn off the fuselage.

The zone of the crash had been cordoned off by security teams, as well as Mexican police and military, for the safety of the public.

Aftermath
The crash site received a full environmental cleanup and salvage operation, under the supervision of Mexican authorities.

Study result

The conclusion for this test was that, in a case like this, passengers at the front of an aircraft would be the ones most at risk in a crash. Passengers seated closer to the airplane's wings would have suffered serious but survivable injuries such as broken ankles.  The test dummies near the tail section were largely intact; so any passengers there would have likely walked away without serious injury.  However, in other crashes, such as when the tail hits the ground first, as was the case with Asiana Airlines flight 214, in which a Boeing 777-200ER crashed short of the runway at San Francisco International Airport, the reverse might apply.  The brace position was found to be protective against concussion and spinal injuries, but created additional loads on the legs that could result in fractured legs or ankles.  Additionally, the aircraft's wiring and cosmetic panels were shown to have collapsed into the passenger compartment, creating debris hazards and obstacles to evacuation.

Television program
A television program about the experiment was produced by Discovery Channel (United States), Dragonfly Film and Television Productions (United Kingdom), Pro Sieben (Germany), and Channel 4 (United Kingdom).

The crash was the subject of a Discovery Channel television series Curiosity 2-hour episode "Plane Crash".  The episode was aired on October 7, 2012, and narrated by Josh Charles.

The 1-hour-35-minute episode "The Plane Crash" aired on Channel 4 in Britain on October 11, 2012. The program garnered criticism in Britain, as it was aired less than a fortnight after the Sita Air Flight 601 air crash in Nepal.

The 2-hour "Plane Crash" episode of Curiosity aired on Discovery Channel Canada on October 28, 2012, and on Discovery Channel India on December 17, 2012.

ProSieben planned to air the documentary special before the end of 2012 and the French channel France 5 broadcast it on June 23, 2013.

See also
 Controlled Impact Demonstration

References

External links
 "Discovery Channel Crashes a Passenger Jet For a Science Documentary", pictures Discovery Channel (USA)
 "ABOUT Curiosity: Plane Crash" Discovery Channel Canada
 "The Plane Crash" Channel 4 (UK)
 History of N293AS
 "Curiosity" Plane Crash page on imdb.com

2012 in aviation 
Aviation safety 
Experiments 
American documentary television films
Discovery Channel 
ProSiebenSat.1 Media 
Channel 4 original programming 
Boeing 727
Aviation in Mexico